The Northern Negros Natural Park is a protected area of the Philippines located in the northern mountainous forest region of the island of Negros in the Visayas. It is spread over five municipalities and six cities in the province of Negros Occidental and is the province's largest watershed and water source for seventeen municipalities and cities including the Bacolod metropolitan area. The park was established first as a forest reserve spanning  on 28 April 1935 through Administrative Act No. 789 signed by Governor-General Frank Murphy. In 2005, the protected area was converted into a natural park under the National Integrated Protected Areas System (NIPAS) Act by virtue of Proclamation No. 895 signed by President Gloria Arroyo.

Geography
It covers the highland interior of the island and spans the cities and municipalities of Murcia, Salvador Benedicto, Talisay, Silay, Enrique B. Magalona, Victorias, Cadiz, Sagay, Toboso, Calatrava and San Carlos near the boundary with the province of Negros Oriental. Secondary forests are found in the lower slopes which are crossed by four major river systems namely, the Malogo, Imbang, Himoga-an and Bago rivers.

Biodiversity
The park belongs to the Negros–Panay Biogeographic Region. It is one of two remaining lowland forests on Negros island, the other being in the Dumaguete watershed area in Mount Talinis on the southern end of the island in Negros Oriental.

The park is a habitat to important fauna including the Visayan spotted deer, Visayan warty pig, Philippine naked-backed fruit bat, and the endangered Negros shrew.

Number of endemic and threatened species of birds have been documented in the park, which includes the Visayan hornbill, Negros bleeding-heart, white-winged cuckooshrike, flame-templed babbler, white-throated jungle flycatcher, Visayan flowerpecker, Yellow-faced flameback, Negros striped babbler and green-faced parrotfinch.

Flora documented within the park include hardwood tree species (Dipterocarps), as well as palms, orchids, herbs and trees with medicinal value. Very rare is the local species of the cycas tree (locally called pitogo), probably a Cycas vespertilio. Another prehistoric flora is present in the park like the tree ferns and the also protected Agathis philippinensis, (locally known as almaciga).

Recent events
Salvador Benedicto is considered the "Summer Capital of Negros Occidental" where pine trees line its main highway and where two-thirds of the entire town is within the natural park. Negros Occidental Representative Julio Ledesma IV also filed a bill seeking to create a 200-hectare townsite from the proposed 500-hectare government property. However, Governor Alfredo Marañon was opposed to the idea of encroaching into the protected area and instead offered converting areas in the municipal proper into a townsite.

References

External links
Information (in German) and Photos about Northern Negros National Park

Natural parks of the Philippines
Geography of Negros Occidental
Protected areas established in 1935
1935 establishments in the Philippines